The Abraham Lincoln Bicentennial silver dollar is a commemorative coin issued by the United States Mint in 2009.

Legislation 
The Abraham Lincoln Commemorative Coin Act authorized the production of a commemorative silver dollar to commemorate the bicentennial of the birth of Abraham Lincoln, 16th President of the United States, and one of the country's greatest leaders, guiding the nation through the tumultuous American Civil War. The act allowed the coins to be struck in both proof and uncirculated finishes. The coin was first released on February 12, 2009, the 200th anniversary of Lincoln's birth.

Design
The obverse of the Abraham Lincoln Bicentennial commemorative dollar, designed by Justin Kunz, depicts an image of President Lincoln, which was inspired by 
Daniel Chester French's famous sculpture of the President that sits inside the Lincoln Memorial in Washington. The reverse, designed by Phebe Hemphill, features the last 43 words of the Gettysburg Address.

Specifications
 Display Box Color: Dark Blue
 Edge: Reeded
 Weight: 26.730 grams; 0.8594 troy ounce
 Diameter: 38.10 millimeters; 1.500 inches
 Composition: 90% Silver, 10% Copper

See also

 List of United States commemorative coins and medals (2000s)
 United States commemorative coins

References

2009 establishments in the United States
Abraham Lincoln in art
Modern United States commemorative coins
United States dollar coins
United States silver coins